Norman Ezra Lake (born December 8, 1932) is an American water polo player who competed in the 1952 Summer Olympics.

He was born in Inglewood, California.

Lake was a member of the American water polo team which finished fourth in the 1952 tournament. He played two matches.

External links
profile

1932 births
Living people
American male water polo players
Olympic water polo players of the United States
Water polo players at the 1952 Summer Olympics
Sportspeople from Inglewood, California